Congolanthus is a genus of flowering plants belonging to the family Gentianaceae.

Its native range is Tropical Africa.

Species:
 Congolanthus longidens (N.E.Br.) A.Raynal

References

Gentianaceae
Gentianaceae genera